Diarhabdosia minima is a moth of the subfamily Arctiinae first described by Arthur Gardiner Butler in 1878. It is found from Mexico to the Amazon region.

References

Lithosiini